Kampong Svay is a district within Kampong Thom province, in central  Cambodia. According to the 1998 census of Cambodia, it had a population of 74,843.

Administration 
The following table shows the villages of Kampong Svay District by commune.

See also 
 Prasat Andat

References 

Districts of Kampong Thom province